Homeobox containing 1, also known as homeobox telomere-binding protein 1 (HOT1), is a protein that in humans is encoded by the HMBOX1 gene. HMBOX1 directly binds to the double-stranded repeat sequence of telomeres.

HMBOX1 has originally been identified to associate with telomeric chromatin in telomerase-positive cancer cells and cancer cells that maintain their telomeres based on the Alternative Lengthening of Telomeres (ALT)  mechanism by the 'reverse ChIP' technique PICh (Proteomics of Isolated Chromatin segments). Subsequently, direct binding to telomeric DNA was demonstrated through a co-crystal structure of the DNA-binding domain of HMBOX1 with telomeric DNA. Loss-of-function and gain-of-function experiments classify HMBOX1 as a positive regulator of telomere length. HMBOX1 had originally been described as a transcriptional repressor based on reporter gene assays, but genome-wide approaches using RNA-seq and ChIP-seq see little to no such effect at least in several cancer cell lines.

References

Further reading 

Genes on human chromosome 8
Telomeres